Love You Stranger is a 2022 Philippine television drama mystery romance series broadcast by GMA Network. Directed by Irene Villamor, it stars Gabbi Garcia and Khalil Ramos. It premiered on June 6, 2022 on the network's Telebabad line up replacing Mano Po Legacy: Her Big Boss. The series concluded on August 11, 2022 with a total of 40 episodes.

Cast and characters
Lead cast
 Gabbi Garcia as Lerma Jane "LJ" Escalante
 Khalil Ramos as Benedict "Ben" Mallari

Supporting cast
 Gil Cuerva as Tristan Dela Paz
 Andrea Del Rosario as Lorraine Escalante
 Tonton Gutierrez as Alfonso "Alfie" Dela Paz
 Carmi Martin as Patricia "Patty" Salazar-Dela Paz
 Maey Bautista as Apple Escalante
 Kim De Leon as Diego David
 Lexi Gonzales as Coleen Castro
 Dindo Arroyo as Mayor Bienvenido "Boying" Chavez
 Bodjie Pascua as Larry Advincula
 Alex Medina as Bill
 Ces Quesada as Edna Malabanan
 Nor Domingo as Rodolfo
 Lui Manansala as Norma
 Soliman Cruz as Pete
 Angeli Nicole Sanoy as Bunny
 Dennis Padilla as Luciano
Guest cast
 Dentrix Ponce as young Ben
 Kyle Ocampo as young LJ
 Levince Sotto as young Tristan
 Wendell Ramos as Javier Escalante

Production
Principal photography commenced on February 16, 2021.

Ratings
According to AGB Nielsen Philippines' Nationwide Urban Television Audience Measurement People Overnight Ratings, the pilot episode of Love You Stranger earned a 6.5% rating.

References

External links
 
 

2022 Philippine television series debuts
2022 Philippine television series endings
Filipino-language television shows
GMA Network drama series
Philippine romance television series
Television shows set in the Philippines